Bishawnath Halder (born 1 February 1987) is a Bangladeshi first-class cricketer who plays for Khulna Division.

See also
 List of Khulna Division cricketers

References

External links
 

1987 births
Living people
Bangladeshi cricketers
Dhaka Metropolis cricketers
Khulna Division cricketers
People from Khulna